may refer to:
 Tokyo
 
 Osaka Prefecture
 Ohtani Junior and Senior High School (Osaka)